Mount Bradley is a summit in the U.S. state of Montana.

Mount Bradley was named after Richard Bradley, a local ranger.

References

Mountains of Flathead County, Montana
Bradley